Khlong San Thao is a watercourse in the provinces of Phetchabun and Phichit, Thailand, and part of the overall Chao Phraya River basin. It is a direct tributary of the Nan River in the lower Nan basin.

The watercourse is referred to by a lot of local names including Khlong Duea, Khlong Yai, Khlong Wang Pong, Khlong Phikun, Khlong Lam Prada, Khlong Daeng, Khlong Thap Khlo, Khlong Bang Phai, Khlong Thai Thung and Khlong San Thao.
San Thao